The Basilica of Sylvester could refer to:
San Silvestro in Capite
San Martino ai Monti, also known as Santi Silvestro e Martino ai Monti - Titolo Equizio